The Minister of Mines in New Zealand was a former cabinet member appointed by the Prime Minister to be responsible for New Zealand's mining industries. The portfolio was abolished in 1977 and its responsibilities were assumed by the Minister of Energy.

List of ministers
The following ministers held the office of Minister of Mines.

Key

See also
 Mining in New Zealand

Notes

References

Mines
Mining in New Zealand